Now That's What I Call Big Sir is a remix album by Big Sir. It consists of various remixes of songs from their first self-titled album.

Track listing
 "Nonstop Drummer (Playboy Gigolo Bandit Remix)" by Mickey Petralia - 4:35	
 "The Pistol Chasers (Fab Moe Remix)" - 3:40 	
 "Sad Elephant (Justin Meldal-Johnsen Remix)" - 4:50	
 "Ruby Road (Fred C. Remix)" - 	3:19	
 "Sara Smile" (Hall & Oates) - 4:17 	
 "Fuzak (Dan the Automator Remix)" - 3:35	
 "Le Baron (Old School Brian Remix)" - 3:39 	
 "G7 (Adam 12 Remix)" - 4:27 	
 "Lisa's Theme (Brazilian Feather in the Wind Remix)" by David Casco - 4:27	
 "Everybody Here Wants You" (Jeff Buckley) - 4:36

Personnel
Big Sir
Juan Alderete - bass
Lisa Papineau - vocals
Troy Zeigler - drums, backing vocals

References

2001 remix albums
Big Sir (band) albums